The Men's double FITA round 2-6 was an archery competition in the 1988 Summer Paralympics.

Gold medalist was Swiss Michel Baudois who won his second medal after New York / Stoke Mandeville 1984.

Results

References

1988 Summer Paralympics events